

Traveler (died 1912), was a foundation sire of the American Quarter Horse breed, but mystery surrounds him as his breeding is completely unknown. He appeared in Texas in the mid-1880s and eventually ended up as a match racehorse and stallion. Some stories have him part of a contractor's work string doing grading work on a railroad being constructed in Eastland County, Texas.<ref name=QuarterPaths>Chamberlain Quarter Paths: Traveler from Oblivion to Fame" Quarter Racing Journal pp. 16, 68, 71</ref> Whether or not this story is true, the first recorded owner of Traveler was a man named Brown Seay.

Traveler was a light sorrel horse, with light amounts of roaning on his flanks. Markings were a snip, and a streak on the face. He was also owned by the Shely brothers, who bred most of his most famous offspring. While owned by Seay, Traveler was match raced extensively in Texas.

Traveler died in 1912 and sources estimate his age at 32. He sired such influential Quarter Horses as Little Joe, King (later named Possum), Jim Ned, Judge Thomas, Texas Chief, and Captain Joe. Other descendants included Joe Reed II, Hard Twist, Silver King, Tonto Bars Hank, and Tonto Bars Gill.

Traveler was inducted into the AQHA Hall of Fame in 1994.

 Notes 

 References 

 AQHA Hall of Fame accessed on September 2, 2017
 
 
 
 
 
 

Further reading

 Reynolds, Franklin "They Called Him Traveler" Quarter Horse Journal May 1957 p. 7–9, 22–23, 34–36, 54–65
 Rockingham, Montague "Traveler: Greatest Sire Since Sir Archy" The Western Horseman'' January 1949 p. 10–11, 33

External links
 Traveler at Quarter Horse Directory
 Traveler at Quarter Horse Legends

American Quarter Horse racehorses
American Quarter Horse sires
1912 racehorse deaths
AQHA Hall of Fame (horses)